In mathematics and physics, in particular differential geometry and general relativity, a warped geometry is a Riemannian or Lorentzian manifold whose metric tensor can be written in form

The geometry almost decomposes into a Cartesian product of the y geometry and the x geometry – except that the x part is warped, i.e. it is rescaled by a scalar function of the other coordinates y. For this reason, the metric of a warped geometry is often called a warped product metric.

Warped geometries are useful in that  separation of variables can be used when solving partial differential equations over them.

Examples
Warped geometries acquire their full meaning when we substitute the variable y for t, time and x, for s, space. Then the f(y) factor of the spatial dimension becomes the effect of time that in words of Einstein "curves space". How it curves space will define one or other solution to a space-time world. For that reason, different models of space-time use warped geometries.
Many basic solutions of the Einstein field equations are warped geometries, for example, the Schwarzschild solution and the Friedmann–Lemaitre–Robertson–Walker models.

Also, warped geometries are the key building block of Randall–Sundrum models in string theory.

See also
 Metric tensor
 Exact solutions in general relativity
 Poincaré half-plane model

References

Differential geometry
General relativity